The Black Echo is the 1992 debut novel by American crime author Michael Connelly. It is the first book in Connelly's Bosch series. The book won the Mystery Writers of America Edgar Award for "Best First Novel" in 1992.

Plot
The novel centers on Harry Bosch, a Vietnam veteran who served as a "tunnel rat" (nicknamed Hara Kiri Bosch) with the 1st Infantry Division — a specialized soldier whose job it was to go into the maze of tunnels used as barracks, hospitals, and on some occasions, morgues, by the Vietcong and North Vietnamese Army. After the war Bosch became an L. A. police detective advancing to the Robbery-Homicide Division.  However, after killing the main suspect in the "Dollmaker" serial killings, Bosch is demoted to "Hollywood Division" homicide, where he partners with Jerry Edgar. The death of Billy Meadows, a friend and fellow "tunnel rat" from the war, attracts Bosch's interest, especially when he determines that it may have been connected to a spectacular bank robbery using tunnels.  Bosch suspects that the robbers were after more than money and he then partners with the FBI, in particular agent Eleanor Wish, in an attempt to foil their next attack.

Season 3 of the Amazon series Bosch is loosely adapted from this novel. After Harry captures a suspect, Detective Bosch tells him, "I'm going to make sure you live the rest of your life in the black echo."

Awards

The Black Echo won the 1993 Edgar Award for "Best First Novel" and was also nominated for the Anthony Award in the same category and the Dilys Award for "Best Novel".

References 

Harry Bosch series
1992 American novels
Edgar Award-winning works
Novels set in Los Angeles
1992 debut novels
Little, Brown and Company books